Eiokome was a town of ancient Phrygia, inhabited during Roman times. 

Its site is tentatively located near Söğüt Yaylası in Asiatic Turkey.

References

Populated places in Phrygia
Former populated places in Turkey
Roman towns and cities in Turkey
History of Kütahya Province